If You Only Knew is the second album by American R&B singer Gina Thompson. It was scheduled to be released through Elektra Records/East West Records on September 21, 1999, however it was shelved due to the failure and lack of commercial success for her lead singles, "Ya Di Ya" (#38 U.S. R&B) and "Caught Up". The album, however, was released by Elektra Records for a limited time, due to the lukewarm success of "Ya Di Ya".

Track listing
 "If You Only Knew (Interlude) 
 "Take My Number Down"
 "Ladies Anthem"
 "Calling You"
 "Ya Di Ya" (featuring Missy Elliott)
 "You Can't Play Me"
 "It Hurts"
 "He'll Do It Again (Interlude)"
 "Caught Up" (featuring Beanie Sigel)
 "Cool Out with You"
 "Turn Around"
 "Up All Night" (featuring Jon B.)
 "Don't Take Your Love Away"
 "As Long as God Allows"

References

External links
 [ AllMusic Review]

1999 albums
Elektra Records albums
Unreleased albums